Kirby Bentley (born 9 May 1986) is an Australian rules footballer who played for the  and Carlton Football Clubs in the AFL Women's competition (AFLW). Bentley was signed as a priority player by Fremantle in August 2016 ahead of the league's inaugural 2017 season. She made her debut in Round 1, 2017, in the club's inaugural match against  at VU Whitten Oval.

In 2017, Bentley played a State of Origin match for the Allies and injured her knee, which required surgery. She was delisted by Fremantle at the end of the 2018 season.

In October 2018, Bentley joined Carlton as a free agent.

The Kirby Bentley Cup, an Australian rules football trophy played for by Indigenous girls aged between thirteen and fifteen, is named for Bentley.

Kirby has also played netball for both West Coast Fever and 
Western Sting.

References

External links 

Living people
1986 births
Australian rules footballers from Western Australia
Fremantle Football Club (AFLW) players
Indigenous Australian players of Australian rules football
Carlton Football Club (AFLW) players
Australian netball players
Netball players from Western Australia
West Coast Fever players
Western Sting players
Australian Netball League players
West Australian Netball League players
AIS Canberra Darters players
Hunter Jaegers players
Indigenous Australian netball players